Georg Gebel was the name of two German musicians and composers:
 Georg Gebel (the elder) (1685–1750)
 Georg Gebel (the younger) (1709–1753), his son